Anthony Richard 'Tony' Mayer' (born 1962), is a male retired cyclist who competed for Great Britain and England and was selected for the 1980 Moscow Summer Olympics but Glandular Fever prevented him competing.

Cycling career
He represented England in the 4,000 metres individual pursuit and won a bronze medal in the 4,000 metres team pursuit with Darryl Webster, Shaun Wallace, Gary Sadler and Paul Curran, at the 1982 Commonwealth Games in Brisbane, Queensland, Australia.

He won the 1978 and 1979 Junior Pursuit National Championship before finishing runner-up to Shaun Wallace in the 1982 senior pursuit at the 1982 British National Track Championships.

References

1962 births
English male cyclists
Commonwealth Games medallists in cycling
Commonwealth Games bronze medallists for England
Cyclists at the 1982 Commonwealth Games
Living people
Medallists at the 1982 Commonwealth Games